Datum is, from its Latin origin, a singular form of "data", and may refer to a single item of data.

Singular data point
 Geodetic datum, a standard position or level that measurements are taken from in geographic surveying
 Datum reference, in carpentry, metalworking, needlework, geometric dimensioning and tolerancing 
 Chart datum, level of water depth on a nautical chart 
 Datum or datum point, a (possibly arbitrary) reference baseline or point from which scientific measurements are made (from a Latin meaning of datum as a "given", i.e. an accepted fact)

Publications
 Datum (magazine), an Austrian monthly magazine
 Omne Datum Optimum ("Every perfect gift"), a papal bull issued by Pope Innocent II in 1139 endorsing the Knights Templar

Geography
 Datum Peak, New Zealand
 Datum (Greece), a city in ancient Macedonia